Taint or tainted may refer to:

Impurities
Contamination, the presence of a minor and unwanted element (a contaminant)
 a wine fault, such as cork taint, ladybird taint, or phenolic taint, producing undesirable odors or tastes in bottled wine
 Infection, the colonization of a host organism by parasites
Taint (legal), the quality of illegally obtained court evidence
Taint checking, a feature of some programming languages that prevents unauthorized users from remotely executing commands on a computer

Titles
The Taint (novel) (or Doctor Who and the Taint), a novel written by Michael Collier and based on the British television series Doctor Who
Taint (band), a sludge-metal band from Wales
The Taint (film), a 1915 American silent film
Tainted (film), a 1987 American film

Other uses
Taint (anatomy), colloquial name for the space between the anus and scrotum
Tint, an archaic form, referring to a color mixed with white
Tainted kernel, when proprietary modules are loaded into Linux